Elymnioi is a former municipality in Euboea, Greece. Since the 2011 local government reform it is part of the municipality Mantoudi-Limni-Agia Anna, of which it is a municipal unit. The municipal unit has an area of 161.102 km2. Population 4,490 (2011). The seat of the municipality was in Limni.

References

Populated places in Euboea